Abadan International Airport  is situated 12 kilometers away from the city of Abadan, Iran.

History

During World War II, Abadan Airport was a major logistics center for Lend-Lease aircraft being sent to the Soviet Union by the United States. Beginning in May 1942, the United States Army Air Forces Air Technical Service Command and the Douglas Aircraft Company established a plant here, with the 17th Air Depot Group assembling newly arrived aircraft and flight-testing them. Once prepared, they were flown to Mehrabad Airport, Tehran, for delivery to the Soviets. The airport was designated as Station #3, by the Air Transport Command North African Wing, with connecting routes to Mehrabad Airport, Tehran; RAF Habbaniya, Iraq, and Bahrain Airport, Bahrain.

Airlines and destinations

The following airlines offer scheduled passenger service:

Incidents and accidents
 On 10 September 1958, Mariner P-303 was being ferried to the Netherlands from Biak, Indonesia. Due to technical problems, a forced landing was carried out at Abadan, Iran. About two weeks later, repairs had been accomplished, and the aircraft took off. Shortly after takeoff, an oil leak was observed on engine number one. While on finals for landing at Abadan, the aircraft suddenly lost height and crashed, killing all aboard. It appeared that the remaining propeller reversed thrust, causing the crew to lose control.
 On 24 January 2010, Taban Air Flight 6437, a Tupolev Tu-154M, crashed whilst making an emergency landing at Mashhad International Airport due to a medical emergency; all 157 and 13 crew survived the accident with 42 receiving minor injuries. The flight originated from Abadan the day before but had to overnight stop in Isfahan due to weather in Mashhad.

References

External links

Airports in Iran
Airfields of the United States Army Air Forces
Airfields of the United States Army Air Forces Air Transport Command in the Middle East
Abadan, Iran
World War II airfields in Iran